"Movin'" is a song by Swedish-Congolese singer-songwriter Mohombi. It is the lead single from his second studio album, Universe. The song features Birdman, Caskey from Cash Money Records, and KMC. The song is produced by RedOne and was released on 2 June 2014.

Background
The song is the lead single from Mohombi's second album and was released after the single "Maraca". Birdman wrote the introduction for the song, Caskey wrote the third rap verse and KMC wrote the melody section.

Remixes
There is a remix featuring Puerto Rican duo Alexis & Fido instead of Caskey, titled "Muevelo", the official Spanglish remix of the single. The remix was released on 23 October 2014.

Music video
The music video for the song was released on 6 June 2014 on Mohombi official account. It features the lead artist and the guests on the TV.

Track listing

Release history

References

2014 singles
Mohombi songs
Songs written by Birdman (rapper)
Song recordings produced by RedOne
2014 songs
Songs written by Mohombi
Songs written by Alex P
Songs written by Björn Djupström
Songs written by AJ Junior
Songs written by Bilal Hajji